Right Alliance may refer to:
Right Alliance (Poland), a former Polish centre-right conservative political party
Right Alliance (Belarus), a youth non-governmental organization in Belarus